Profitis Daniil meaning 'Prophet Daniel' is a neighborhood of Athens, Greece. It takes its name from the main church on Athinon Avenue. 

Neighbourhoods in Athens